The Arcade is the debut album of Hyper Crush, which was self-released on May 1, 2008. It is the follow up to Mixtape Volume 1, and features two songs, "Disco Tech" and "Slow Motion," from the mixtape.

Track listing

2008 debut albums